Gampaha is a town in Uva province, Sri Lanka.

Transport 
The nearest railway station is at Bandarawela on the branch railway to Badulla.

See also 
 Transport in Sri Lanka

References 

Populated places in Uva Province